Zofia Atteslander (12 March 1874 in Luborzyca – c. 1928 in Berlin) was a Polish painter, active from 1889–1928 in inter alia Berlin, Paris and Wiesbaden.

Biography 
Primarily she began studying privately with Jacek Malczewski in Kraków, later with Franz von Lenbach, Heinrich Knirr (1862–1944), with Stanisław Grocholski in Munich, and since 1902 with Adolf Hölzel in Dachau. She specialised in portrait painting and still life.

During her stay in Wiesbaden in 1904 she painted portraits for the Romanian Royal Family. During her stay in Paris in 1908 she received an honour at the Saloon of French Artists. In 1904, she took part in Warsaw's Society of the Incentive for Fine Arts (Towarzystwo Zachęty Sztuk Pięknych), as well as in 1903, in Kraków's Society of the Friends of Fine Arts (Towarzystwo Przyjaciół Sztuk Pięknych). Apart from oil painting she also practised pastel drawing. She has often marked her paintings with "Zo". The last documented information of Zofia Atteslander came from 1928.

Works

References

1874 births
1928 deaths
19th-century Polish painters
20th-century Polish painters
Polish women painters
19th-century Polish women artists
20th-century Polish women artists
People from Kraków County